Oroslavje is a town and municipality in  Krapina-Zagorje County in Croatia.

Oroslavje is often referred to as The Gate of Croatian Zagorje (Vrata Hrvatskog zagorja) because of its geographical position and its proximity to The City of Zagreb and Zagreb County.

Location and transport 

Oroslavje is considered to be a town with a good location in Croatia.

Oroslavje is ~30 min  from the capital of The Republic of Croatia, Zagreb. Oroslavje has an entrance/exit point to the A2 Motorway connecting Zagreb to the border crossing Macelj/Gruškovje with Slovenia. Oroslavje also has two entrance/exit points to the D14 Freeway in Croatia connecting the A2 Motorway with Zabok, Bedekovčina, finishing in Zlatar Bistrica. Further expansion of the road to the A4 Motorway which could then be used to get to Zagreb or Varaždin is in progress.

It has frequent public transit. Busses and trains are commonly used.

Demographics 
In the 2011 census, there were 6,124 inhabitants in the following settlements:
 Andraševec, population 859
 Krušljevo Selo, population 523
 Mokrice, population 758
 Oroslavje, population 3,368
 Stubička Slatina, population 630

In the census of 2011, the absolute majority were Croats.

Culture and history 

The history of the city is tightly connected with the two castles in the town of Oroslavje. Oroslavje used to have two castles, but now only has one. The castle in so-called "Gornje Oroslavje" or "Upper Oroslavje" used to belong to the Čuklins, followed by the Vranyczanys. It was almost completely destroyed in the fire of 1949 and was later demolished. The only thing saved was the French-style park in front of the castle with a fountain.

The second castle that used to be owned by the Vojkiffy family remained whole, but it is currently in bad shape.

The Oroslavje church is supposed to be built in 1652 or 1653. It is first mentioned in historical sources in 1669. Its current shape was made in the beginning of the 20th century. The church is currently undergoing renovations.

The town day is on 11 August. Every year there is a festival held the week of the town day. Typically, there are many attractions, concerts performed by famous Croatian singers and groups, amusement parks, and so on.

Education 

Elementary school Oroslavje
 District school Krušljevo Selo (Krušljevo Village)
High school Oroslavje
Open University Oroslavje

Sport 

 Ski running club Oroslavje
 Football club Oroslavje (link to Croatian site)
Handball club Oroslavje
Chess club Oroslavje
Tennis club Oroslavje
Car-Motorcycle club Oroslavje
Shooting club Oroslavje
Hunting club "Mokrice"
Hunting club "Kuna"
 Paintball club Dum-Dum (link to Croatian site)
Athletic club Oroslavje
Bowling club "Obrtnik" Oroslavje

Since 2005 the FIS Roller Ski Cup (link to Croatian site) is held in Oroslavje

References

External links

Elementary school Oroslavje
High school Oroslavje

Cities and towns in Croatia
Populated places in Krapina-Zagorje County